Michael G. Kavulich (August 22, 1956 – October 16, 2018), known as Sid Michaels Kavulich, was an American politician, radio, and television broadcaster.

Biography
Kavulich was born in Taylor, Pennsylvania and graduated from Riverside Jr/Sr High School in 1974. In 1976, he received his associate arts degree in broadcasting from Williamsport Area Community College. Kavulich was a radio and television broadcaster.

Political career
He was a Democratic member of the Pennsylvania House of Representatives. He was first elected in 2010, and was sworn-in on January 4, 2011. He served on the Aging & Older Adult Services, Agriculture and Rural Affairs, Commerce, and the Finance Committees.

Death
Kavulich died on October 16, 2018, at the University of Pennsylvania, in Philadelphia, Pennsylvania, following complications from heart surgery. He was reelected unopposed on November 6, 2018, having died too late into the race for his name to be removed or replaced with another candidate.

References

External links

Pennsylvania House of Representatives - Sid Michaels Kavulich (Democrat)
Pennsylvania House Democratic Caucus - Sid Michaels Kavulich
Sid Michaels Kavulich for State Representative

1956 births
2018 deaths
Democratic Party members of the Pennsylvania House of Representatives
People from Lackawanna County, Pennsylvania
21st-century American politicians
Politicians elected posthumously